wouzee is an interactive broadcast platform for streaming video that allows users to visualize and share play and stream video using different devices video camera or a computer through Internet. The user produces, shares and consumes information actively. In addition to the free support, Wouzee offers a premium service through livestreaming event production.

Wouzee became known nationally when one of their users decided to upload a video in which Infanta Cristina stated on the Noos Case. afterwards, was published by the Spanish newspaper El Mundo.

References

External links 
 Official site

Video